WNIK can refer to:

 WNIK (AM), a radio station (1230 AM) licensed to Arecibo, Puerto Rico
 WNIK-FM, a radio station (106.5 FM) licensed to Arecibo, Puerto Rico